Hassan Mattar (born 1 January 1956 in Doha, Qatar) is a Qatari former striker who played for Al Sadd and Qatar. He currently serves as the Head of Youth Teams for Al Sadd.

He was an international for the Qatar national team, participating in the Gulf Cup of Nations. He started off playing for Al Oruba, but when the head coach Hassan Osman transferred to Al Sadd, he brought Mattar with him. At that time in Qatari football, players could transfer from clubs virtually unconditionally with no clubs paying to transfer players. He received a call from Sheikh Hamad bin Suhaim, the former president of Al Oruba, who was shocked at Mattar's decision to switch clubs. Nonetheless, he stayed with his current club. He played a crucial role in the 1982 Emir Cup, where he scored the winner against Al Rayyan, and also in the league, where he was the top scorer in the 1980–81 season. The last Emir Cup he participated in was the 1982 edition.

He had a role in Al Sadds management in the early 1990s and was later appointed Head of Youth Teams.

Honors
Individual
Qatar Stars League top scorer:
1980–81

References

Qatar international footballers
1956 births
Living people
People from Doha
Al Sadd SC players
Qatar SC players
Qatari footballers
Qatar Stars League players
Association football forwards